Paraxanthine, or 1,7-dimethylxanthine, is a dimethyl derivative of xanthine, structurally related to caffeine.

Production and metabolism
Paraxanthine is not known to be produced by plants but is observed in nature as a metabolite of caffeine in animals and some species of bacteria. After intake, roughly 84% of caffeine is demethylated at the 3-position to yield paraxanthine, making it the primary metabolite of caffeine in humans.

Paraxanthine is also a major metabolite of caffeine in humans and other animals, such as mice. Shortly after ingestion, caffeine is metabolized into paraxanthine by hepatic cytochrome P450, which removes a methyl group from the N3 position of caffeine. After formation, paraxanthine can be broken down to 7-methylxanthine by demethylation of the N1 position, which is subsequently demethylated into xanthine or oxidized by CYP2A6 and CYP1A2 into 1,7-dimethyluric acid. In another pathway, paraxanthine is broken down into 5-acetylamino-6-formylamino-3-methyluracil through N-acetyl-transferase 2, which is then broken down into 5-acetylamino-6-amino-3-methyluracil by non-enzymatic decomposition. In yet another pathway, paraxanthine is metabolized CYPIA2 forming 1-methyl-xanthine, which can then be metabolized by xanthine oxidase to form 1-methyl-uric acid.

Certain proposed synthetic pathways of caffeine make use of paraxanthine as a bypass intermediate. However, its absence in plant alkaloid assays implies that these are infrequently, if ever, directly produced by plants.

Pharmacology and physiological effects

Like caffeine, paraxanthine is a psychoactive central nervous system (CNS) stimulant.

Pharmacodynamics
Studies indicate that, similar to caffeine, simultaneous antagonism of adenosine receptors is responsible for paraxanthine's stimulatory effects. Paraxanthine adenosine receptor binding affinity (21 μM for A1, 32 μM for A2A, 4.5 μM for A2B, and >100 for μM for A3) is similar or slightly stronger than caffeine, but weaker than theophylline.

Paraxanthine is a selective inhibitor of cGMP-preferring phosphodiesterase (PDE9) activity and is hypothesized to increase glutamate and dopamine release by potentiating nitric oxide signaling. Activation of a nitric oxide-cGMP pathway may be responsible for some of the behavioral effects of paraxanthine that differ from those associated with caffeine.

Paraxanthine is a competitive nonselective phosphodiesterase inhibitor which raises intracellular cAMP, activates PKA, inhibits TNF-alpha and leukotriene synthesis, and reduces inflammation and innate immunity.

Unlike caffeine, paraxanthine acts as an enzymatic effector of Na+/K+ ATPase.  As a result, it is responsible for increased transport of potassium ions into skeletal muscle tissue.  Similarly, the compound also stimulates increases in calcium ion concentration in muscle.

Pharmacokinetics
The pharmacokinetic parameter for paraxanthine are similar to those for caffeine, but differ significantly from those for theobromine and theophylline, the other major caffeine-derived methylxanthine metabolites in humans (Table 1).

Uses
Paraxanthine is a phosphodiesterase type 9 (PDE9) inhibitor and it is sold as a research molecule for this same purpose.

Toxicity 
Paraxanthine is believed to exhibit a lower toxicity than caffeine and the caffeine metabolite, theophylline. In a mouse model, intraperitoneal paraxanthine doses of 175 mg/kg/day did not result in animal death or overt signs of stress; by comparison, the intraperitoneal LD50 for caffeine in mice is reported at 168 mg/kg.  In in vitro cell culture studies, paraxanthine is reported to be less harmful than caffeine and the least harmful of the caffeine-derived metabolites in terms of hepatocyte toxicity.

As with other methylxanthines, paraxanthine is  reported to be teratogenic when administered in high doses; but it is a less potent teratogen as compared to caffeine and theophylline. A mouse study on the potentiating effects of methylxanthines coadministered with mitoycin C on teratogenicity reported the incidence of birth defects for caffeine, theophylline, and paraxanthine to be 94.2%, 80.0%, and 16.9%, respectively; additionally, average birth weight decreased significantly in mice exposed to caffeine or theophylline when coadministered with mitomycin C, but not for paraxanthine coadministered with mitomycin C.

Paraxanthine was reported to be significantly less clastogenic compared to caffeine or theophylline in an in vitro study using human lymphocytes.

References

External links 

Adenosine receptor antagonists
Animal metabolites
Phosphodiesterase inhibitors
Stimulants
Xanthines